is a Japanese football player for SC Sagamihara.

Club Statistics 
Updated to 23 February 2017.

References

External links
Profile at SC Sagamihara

1989 births
Living people
People from Fukui (city)
Association football people from Fukui Prefecture
Japanese footballers
J1 League players
J2 League players
J3 League players
Japan Football League players
Yokohama F. Marinos players
Thespakusatsu Gunma players
Oita Trinita players
Zweigen Kanazawa players
Fukushima United FC players
SC Sagamihara players
Association football defenders